The Mamas & the Papas were a vocal group from Los Angeles, California that was active from 1966 to 1969. Their discography consists of a total of five albums and seventeen singles, six of which made the Billboard top ten, and sold close to 40 million records worldwide.  Monday, Monday hit #1 on the Billboard Hot 100 chart in March 1966 and California Dreamin' was the top song on the Billboard Year-End Hot 100 singles of 1966.

The Mamas and the Papas' recordings were released on Dunhill Records until 1967, when the company was sold and the label became ABC-Dunhill. Around 1973, ABC-Dunhill discarded all multi-track session recordings and mono masters because they were deemed obsolete and too expensive to store. The original recordings of The Mamas and the Papas, and of labelmates such as Three Dog Night, are therefore lost, and it has been necessary to create digital versions from the stereo album masters, often second- or third-generation tapes. This is why the sound quality of Mamas and Papas' reissues does not match the best from the 1960s. In 2012, Sundazed Records located a mono master of If You Can Believe Your Eyes and Ears in the UK and released it on 180-gram vinyl and a limited edition of 500 compact discs.

The singles "California Dreamin' and "Monday, Monday" have both been certified as gold records by the RIAA.

Albums

Studio albums

Select compilation albums

Singles

See also
The Mugwumps discography
Denny Doherty discography
Cass Elliot discography
John Phillips discography
Michelle Phillips discography

Notes

References

External links

Discography
Discographies of American artists
Rock music group discographies